Wardaman is an Australian Aboriginal language isolate. It is one of the northern non-Pama–Nyungan languages. Dagoman and Yangman (both extinct) were either dialects or closely related languages; as a family, these are called Yangmanic.

Classification
Though previously classified as Gunwinyguan, the Yangmanic languages have not been demonstrated to be related to other languages.

The isolate Wagiman shares a very similar morphosyntactic profile with the Yangmanic languages, although they share very low cognacy rates (about 10% according to Stephen Wilson). Francesca Merlan supports its grouping together with Yangmanic, citing that both together differ from neighbouring languages (such as the Gunwinyguan language Jawoyn and Mangarrayi) while sharing very similar syntax with each other, such as their similar use of 'verbal particles'.

Phonology
The phonological inventory of Wardaman proper:

Consonants

The alveolo-palatals are pronounced with the blade of the tongue; at the end of a syllable they may sound like yn and yl to an English ear. Even the y is said to have lateral spread and to be pronounced with the blade and body of the tongue. There is very little acoustic difference between the two apical series compared to other languages in the area. The alveolars may add a slight retroflex onglide to a following vowel, and the retroflexes may assimilate alveolars in the same word. Nonetheless, they remain phonemically distinct. Francesca describes the w as bilabial, and notes that there is little or no lip rounding or protrusion (except in assimilation to a following /u/ or /o/). The r is post-alveolar.

Vowels

Vocabulary
Capell (1940) lists the following basic vocabulary items for Wadaman (Wardaman):

{| class="wikitable sortable"
! gloss
! Wadaman
|-
| man
| 
|-
| woman
| 
|-
| head
| 
|-
| eye
| 
|-
| nose
| 
|-
| mouth
| 
|-
| tongue
| 
|-
| stomach
| 
|-
| bone
| 
|-
| blood
| 
|-
| kangaroo
| 
|-
| opossum
| 
|-
| emu
| 
|-
| crow
| 
|-
| fly
| 
|-
| sun
| 
|-
| moon
| 
|-
| fire
| 
|-
| smoke
| 
|-
| water
| 
|}

Notes

References

Merlan Francesca. 1983. A Grammar of Wardaman. A Language of the Northern Territory of Australia. Mouton de Gruyter. 1994.

Language isolates of Australia
Endangered indigenous Australian languages in the Northern Territory
Endangered language isolates